Martine Condé Ilboudo (born 1948) is a Burkinabé film director.

Life
Martine Condé Ilboudo was born in Saint-Alexis, Siguiri, Guinea. She has a masters in communication from the University of Ottawa. After studying communication, she became one of the first to establish a production company in Burkina Faso.

Martine Condé Ilboudo was appointed President of the National Council of Communication (CNC). In December 2017 she was decorated by the government as Commander of the Order of Merit for Arts, Letters and Communication.

Films
 Siao 92, 1992
 Jazz a Ouaga, 1993
 Un cri dans la sahel, 1994
 Message des femmes pour Beijing, 1995
 Être femme aujourd'hui, 1998
 Less Percussions de Guinée, 2000

References

1948 births
Living people
Burkinabé women film directors
Burkinabé film directors
21st-century Burkinabé people